Sex Workers Education and Advocacy Taskforce (SWEAT) is a South African organisation that deals with organising sex workers, advocating for and delivering services to South African sex workers. The organisation (popularly known as SWEAT) was established 24 years ago by Shane Petzer (a male sex worker) and Ilse Pauw (clinical psychologist) with the intention to create safe sex education for adult sex workers, and advocate for sex workers rights. The organisation supports the decriminalization of sex work. SWEAT are affiliated with the transgender sex worker support group SistaazHood.

History 
According to their website, SWEAT was registered in 1996, and have been working with sex workers in Cape Town since then.

Programmes 
SWEAT has several programmes that support sex workers including legal assistance.

Notable work 
SWEAT won an interdict on high court in Cape Town prohibiting the arrest of sex workers for an ulterior purpose.

Research
SWEAT have carried out a number of research projects:

 Violence against sex workers 1996 
  Policing Sex Workers/Violence against Sex workers 1996/2004
 Demographic Survey 2005
 Coping with Stigma/Health Care Gaps 2005
 Selling Sex in Cape Town 2008
 Outdoor organisational assessment 2010 
 Monitoring of human rights violations 2010 
 Indoor sector research 2010

References

External links
 YouTube channel

Sex worker organizations
Prostitution in South Africa